The Sixth Cabinet of Kim Kielsen was the Government of Greenland, in office between 9 April 2019 and 29 May 2020, where Kielsen VII Cabinet took over. It was a coalition minority government consisting of Siumut and Descendants of Our Country.

List of ministers
The Social Democratic Forward had 6 ministers including the Premier. The Centrist party Descendants of Our Country had 1 minister.

|}

See also 
Cabinet of Greenland

References

 

Government of Greenland
Coalition governments
Politics of Greenland
Political organisations based in Greenland
Kielsen, Kim V
2016 establishments in Greenland
Cabinets established in 2018
2018 in Greenland
Greenland politics-related lists